Legionovia Legionowo is a Polish football club based in the city of Legionowo, Mazovia.

History
They were founded in 1930, as part of the multi-sports club, by members of the Polish Socialist Party under the name Workers' Sports Club The Reds. It was one of the few clubs that continued to play during the Second World War.

In the 2018-19 season they reached the last 16 of the Polish Cup.

They have been playing in the III liga for most of the 21st Century, with the exception of between 2013 and 2018 when they played in the league above.

Current squad
As of 7 May 2022

Stadium
The club plays their home games at the Municipal Stadium.

References

External links
 Official website
 Legionovia Legionowo at the 90minut.pl website (Polish)

Association football clubs established in 1930
1930 establishments in Poland
Legionowo County
Football clubs in Masovian Voivodeship